Bapusaheb Parulekar (born 2 July 1929 in Bandra, Bombay, India) was an Indian member of the 6th Lok Sabha and 7th Lok Sabha of India. His real name was Chandrakant Parulekar, but he was better known by the honorific 'Bapusaheb'. He represented the Ratnagiri constituency of Maharashtra, winning the election in 1977 and 1980, and was a member of the Jan Sangh until 1977, when it merged with Janata Party.

References

India MPs 1977–1979
India MPs 1980–1984
1929 births
Living people
Marathi politicians
Bharatiya Jana Sangh politicians
Janata Party politicians
Lok Sabha members from Maharashtra
People from Ratnagiri district
Maharashtra district councillors
Bharatiya Lok Dal politicians